Philip William "Otto" Stekl (born January 20, 1956 in Middletown, Connecticut) is an American former competitive rower and Olympic silver medalist.  Stekl graduated from the University of Pennsylvania in 1978 with a Bachelor of Arts degree.

Olympian
Stekl qualified for the 1980 U.S. Olympic team but was unable to compete due to the 1980 Summer Olympics boycott. In 2007, he received one of 461 Congressional Gold Medals created especially for the spurned athletes. At the 1984 Summer Olympics, Stekl finished in 2nd place in the men's coxless four competition with David Clark, Jonathan Smith, and Alan Forney.

References

1956 births
Living people
American male rowers
Rowers at the 1984 Summer Olympics
Olympic silver medalists for the United States in rowing
Medalists at the 1984 Summer Olympics
Pan American Games medalists in rowing
Pan American Games gold medalists for the United States
Congressional Gold Medal recipients
Rowers at the 1979 Pan American Games
University of Connecticut alumni